Konopnica is a village in the municipality of Kriva Palanka, North Macedonia. One of the largest settlements in the municipality, it is located just west of Kriva Palanka town.

Demographics
According to the 2002 census, the village had a total of 1,398 inhabitants. Ethnic groups in the village include:

Macedonians 1,395
Serbs 2
Other 1

References

Villages in Kriva Palanka Municipality